Abantis tanobia, the Ghana paradise skipper, is a butterfly in the family Hesperiidae. It is found in western Ghana. The habitat consists of forests.

Adults are on wing in December, January and February.

References

Endemic fauna of Ghana
Butterflies described in 2005
Tagiadini